Daral Sarvar (also Romanized as Dārāl Sarvar; also known as Dārā Sarvar and Dār os Sarvar) is a village in Kuhpayeh-e Sharqi Rural District, in the Central District of Abyek County, Qazvin Province, Iran. At the 2006 census, its population was 169, in 45 families.

References 

Populated places in Abyek County